Leonel de Cervantes y Caravajal (died 1637) was a Roman Catholic prelate who served as Bishop of Antequera (1636–1637), Bishop of Guadalajara (1629–1636), Bishop of Santiago de Cuba (1625–1629), and Bishop of Santa Marta (1621–1625).

Biography
Leonel de Cervantes y Caravajal was born in México.
On 17 March 1621, Leonel de Cervantes y Caravajal was appointed during the papacy of Pope Gregory XV as Bishop of Santa Marta.
On 15 July 1622, he was consecrated bishop by Hernando de Arias y Ugarte, Archbishop of Santafé en Nueva Granada. 
On 1 December 1625, he was appointed during the papacy of Pope Urban VIII as Bishop of Santiago de Cuba. 
On 17 December 1629, he was appointed during the papacy of Pope Urban VIII as Bishop of Guadalajara and installed on 26 June 1631. 
On 18 February 1636, he was appointed during the papacy of Pope Urban VIII as Bishop of Antequera. 
He served as Bishop of Antequera until his death in 1637.

References

External links and additional sources
 (for Chronology of Bishops) 
 (for Chronology of Bishops) 
 (for Chronology of Bishops) 
 (for Chronology of Bishops) 
 (for Chronology of Bishops)  
 (for Chronology of Bishops) 
 (for Chronology of Bishops) 
 (for Chronology of Bishops) 

17th-century Roman Catholic bishops in Cuba
Bishops appointed by Pope Gregory XV
Bishops appointed by Pope Urban VIII
1637 deaths
17th-century Roman Catholic bishops in Mexico
Roman Catholic bishops of Santiago de Cuba
Roman Catholic bishops of Santa Marta